St. John African Methodist Episcopal Church may refer to:
St. John African Methodist Episcopal Church (Cleveland, Ohio)
St. John African Methodist Episcopal Church (Omaha, Nebraska)
St. John African Methodist Episcopal Church (Topeka, Kansas)
St. John's African Methodist Episcopal Church (Norfolk, Virginia)